Shalimar Bagh Assembly constituency is one of the seventy Delhi assembly constituencies of Delhi in northern India.

Shalimar Bagh assembly constituency is part of Chandni Chowk. As of 10 February 2015, the seat is held by Ms.Bandana Kumari (mother tongue Bajjika) of Aam Aadmi Party as she defeated Ms. Rekha Gupta of Bharatiya Janata Party (BJP). The constituency number of the seat is 14 in the local Delhi Assembly.

Earlier, Shalimar Bagh was part of Outer Delhi, but after delimitation in 2008 by Delimitation Commission of India, it became part of Chandni Chowk.

Members of Legislative Assembly

Key

Election results

2020

2015

2013

2008

2003

1998

1993

References

Assembly constituencies of Delhi
Delhi Legislative Assembly
Neighbourhoods in Delhi